The following lists events that happened during 1827 in Australia.

Incumbents
Monarch - George IV

Governors
Governors of the Australian colonies:
Governor of New South Wales - Lieutenant-General Ralph Darling
Governor of Tasmania - Colonel George Arthur

Events
 5 January - First boat regatta held on the River Derwent. On 30 April a regatta was held in Sydney.
 Theatre Royal, Sydney opened.

Exploration and settlement
 18 June - James Stirling establishes the Fort Wellington settlement at Raffles Bay, on the Cobourg Peninsula, Northern Territory.

Births

 24 October – James Rutherford, transit pioneer (born in the United States) (d. 1911)

References

 
Australia
Years of the 19th century in Australia